Hola Hola may refer to:

 Hola Hola (EP), 2017
 "Hola Hola" (song), the title song
 Hola Hola, an EP by the  Rosso Sisters, 2014